Luciano Trolli (13 March 1904 – 19 May 1973) was an Italian swimmer. He competed in the men's 200 metre breaststroke event at the 1924 Summer Olympics.

References

External links
 

1904 births
1973 deaths
Olympic swimmers of Italy
Swimmers at the 1924 Summer Olympics
Place of birth missing
Italian male breaststroke swimmers
20th-century Italian people